State Road 483 (SR 483) is a north–south route in Daytona Beach, consisting of a section of Clyde Morris Boulevard between and State Road 400 (Beville Road) and State Road 430 (Mason Avenue). The remainder of the road, north to State Road 40 and south to State Road 421 is County Road 483 (CR 483).

At the vicinity of the Embry-Riddle Aeronautical University, an elaborate pedestrian bridge crosses over the road.

Major intersections

References

External links

483
483
0483